The Girl Who Knew Too Much is a 1963 Italian giallo film. Directed by Italian filmmaker Mario Bava, the film stars John Saxon as Dr. Marcello Bassi and Letícia Román as Nora Davis. The plot revolves around a young woman named Nora, who travels to Rome and  witnesses a murder. The police and Dr. Bassi don't believe her since a corpse can't be found. Several more murders follow, tied to a decade-long string of killings of victims chosen in alphabetical order.

The Girl Who Knew Too Much is considered to be the first giallo film, a film genre with a mixture of thriller, sexploitation and horror conventions. An alternative cut titled Evil Eye was released in the United States by American International Pictures; this version features a score by Les Baxter, deletes several scenes, and adds others which place a greater emphasis on comedy compared to the Italian release.

Plot 

On vacation, Nora Davis (Letícia Román) arrives by plane in Rome to visit her elderly ailing aunt. Nora's aunt is being treated by Dr. Marcello Bassi (John Saxon). Nora's aunt passes away on the first night of Nora's visit and she walks to the nearby hospital to notify Dr. Bassi. On the way, she is mugged and knocked out in Piazza di Spagna. When she wakes up, she sees the body of a dead woman lying on the ground near her; a bearded man pulls a knife out of the woman's back. Nora reports this to the police in the hospital, who don't believe her when they find no evidence and think that she is hallucinating.

Later, at a cemetery, Nora meets a close friend of her aunt's, Laura Torrani (Valentina Cortese), who lives in the Piazza di Spagna. Laura plans to vacation soon and allows Nora to stay in her house for the remaining time of the vacation. Nora explores Laura's closet and drawers and comes across newspaper clippings of articles on a serial killer dubbed the "Alphabet Killer" due to his having alphabetically killed people according to their surnames. The killer has already murdered victims whose last names begin with "A," "B," and "C". Nora also finds that the last victim is Laura's sister, whom Nora had seen in a vision. According to the reports in the paper, this murder took place ten years ago. Nora then receives a telephone call, in which an anonymous voice tells her that "'D' is for death," and informs her that she will be the killer's next victim.

Nora receives help from Dr. Marcello, who takes her on a trip to various Roman tourist sites to calm her down as they become more romantically interested in each other. When they return to the Craven house, she receives a call from a person who orders her to go to a particular address. Nora goes there, and she is guided to a vacant room. With Dr. Marcello, she discovers that the voice that guided her to this spot is tape recorded, and the voice warns Nora to leave Rome before it is too late. Nora and Marcello discover that the room is leased to Landini. After several unsuccessful attempts to locate Landini, Nora and Marcello go to the beach to relax. Upon their return to the Craven house, they find Landini, who has been told that they were inquiring about him. Investigative reporter Landini (Dante DiPaolo) has secretly been following them since he spotted Nora in the square.

The reporter wrote about the murder story when it first broke, but he believes that the police would catch the wrong person if he reported the details of the crime. Landini's refusal to publish a report of the murder has put him in financial need. Nora decides to help Landini, but, as they tour Rome, they find no clues. Nora visits Landini's apartment the next day, finding clues that lead her to think that he is the murderer and that she is his next intended victim, but Landini appears to have committed suicide. The same day, Laura returns to Rome from her vacation while Nora and Marcello plan to go to America the following morning. From reading the newspaper, Nora learns that the body of a young woman was found, and she recognizes it as the murdered woman she saw on the night of her arrival in Italy.  After identifying the victim's corpse at the morgue, Nora believes that she has witnessed the murder. Alone in the house that night, Nora notices that the study door is open. On entering, she sees a man rising uncomfortably from his chair. Nora recognizes him as the man who had stood over the dead body she had seen after awakening from having been knocked unconscious upon her arrival in Italy. The man walks towards Nora but collapses to the floor, a knife in his back. Nora is then confronted by Laura who, enraged, confesses to the killings and explains that she stabbed her husband because of his attempts to turn her over to the police. Laura reveals that her desire to steal her sister's money compelled her to murder. Laura attempts to attack Nora, but Laura is suddenly shot dead by her husband. Nora finds that the bearded man she had seen in a daze actually was disposing of the body for his murdering wife. Nora then leaves Italy, happily reunited with Marcello.

Cast

 Letícia Román as Nora Davis (Nora Drowson in Evil Eye)
 John Saxon as Dr. Marcello Bassi
 Valentina Cortese as Laura Craven-Toranni
 Dante DiPaolo as Andrea Landini
 Titti Tomaino as the Inspector
 Luigi Bonos as the Hotel Clerk
 Milo Quesada as De Vico
 Walter Williams (as Robert Buchanan) as Dr. Alessi
 Marta Melocco as the murder victim

Production

Prior to working on The Girl Who Knew Too Much, Bava had taken a six-month break after filming the last of the special effects shots for his previous film Erik the Conqueror. Bava spent this extended period reading mystery and horror magazines.  He pondered retiring from directing and thought he might only return to work on special effects for film. Bava was convinced to return to directing by Samuel Arkoff and Jim Nicholson, who had begun co-producing Italian films for release in the United States. The Girl Who Knew Too Much was the first film in this venture for Arkoff and Nicholson's company American International Pictures (AIP). The film was produced by Galatea Film, which also produced Bava's earlier film Black Sunday, and Coronet films. The film benefited from AIP as a deal was set between the company and Galatea to have confirmed distribution overseas.

The opening credits credit Sergio Corbucci (credited as "Enzo Corbucci"), Ennio de Concini and Eliana de Sabata and the writers of the film, while crediting Mario Bava, Mino Guerrini and Franco Prosperi as collaborators. Italian screenwriter Luigi Cozzi has said that the original script was more of a romantic comedy but the film became more of a thriller as it went into production.

Letícia Román was cast in The Girl Who Knew Too Much; her first leading role. Román knew actor John Saxon  prior to production on the film. Saxon has stated that he was invited by Roman to work on the film by asking if he would be interested in an art film in Rome. Saxon agreed, but on receiving the script he found that he misunderstood her as she said horror film instead. Dante DiPaolo stated that Bava initially thought DiPaolo was too young for his role in the film, but after seeing his screen test he felt DiPaolo understood his part well and cast him in this film and later again in Blood and Black Lace.
Film began with tentative title Incubo infuori programma with the planned English title being Incubus.

The Girl Who Knew Too Much began shooting on May 2, 1962. Director Mario Bava thought the plot was silly, and focused more on the technical aspects of the film. This included shooting the film in black and white, Bava's last film shot in this style. Bava had made earlier films in color, but films in the horror and thriller genre made in Italy were generally shot in black and white in this period. Location shooting in Rome took place at various locations including the Leonardo da Vinci–Fiumicino Airport and the Trinità dei Monti. Some set pieces were borrowed from other Italian films, such as the painting in Nora's aunt's house, which is from Divorce Italian Style.

Saxon stated that he had initially gotten along with Bava during production. Later Saxon would be practicing judo on the beach which would upset Bava who felt as if Saxon was showing off. Saxon stated that later in a conversation with a producer for the film, that the producer said that Román convinced Saxon to enter the film as she said Saxon was in love with her. Saxon felt that Bava was perhaps initially annoyed at him as he felt his action might have interpreted from Bava as trying to usurp attention from Román. Filming finished in July 14, 1962. Bava biographer Tim Lucas said that some re-shoots were apparently done towards the end of 1962. Bava completed the film at a cost of 190 million Italian lire.

The theme song of the film is sung by Adriano Celentano. The film's score was by Roberto Nicolosi, who had previously worked with Bava on Black Sunday (1960) and Erik the Conqueror (1961).

Release
The Girl Who Knew Too Much was first released on February 10, 1963 in Cagliari. The film grossed less than $27,000 on its opening and only weekend and failed to cover its own production cost. The film was the least commercially successful picture in Bava's directorial career. The giallo films were not popular among the Italian film audiences on its initial theatrical release as the genre never gained popularity in its home country until the release of Dario Argento's The Bird with the Crystal Plumage (1970) and The Cat o' Nine Tails (1971). It grossed a total of 80 million Italian lire in Italy. 

The Girl Who Knew Too Much was released by American International Pictures in the United States on May 6, 1964, where it was shown on a double bill with Bava's Black Sabbath; this release of the film retitled it as Evil Eye. Alterations between the two versions include the deletion of several scenes, including all references to marijuana, the addition of more comical scenes, and Roberto Nicolosi's jazz score being replaced with one performed by Les Baxter. The two versions also have different endings. When Bava's films were being released on DVD and Blu-ray, the Evil Eye edit of the film became more difficult to find as Bava's original Italian version of the film was used. This led to audiences knowing the film under its translated Italian title, The Girl Who Knew Too Much.

Reception
In a contemporary review, the Monthly Film Bulletin described the film as "a tolerably silly but quite enjoyable thriller". The reviewer praised the camerawork and acting by Valentina Cortese, whom he compared to Joan Crawford. The reviewer noted the plot, stating that "Bava, always a better cameraman than director hasn't Riccardo Freda's ability to make a merit of cliches, and often seems rather unhappy with his complicated plot, which is packed to the brim with red herrings, lurking shadows and sinister happenings known to thrillerdom."

Director Mario Bava did not look back positively on the film, claiming that he "thought [the film] was too preposterous. Perhaps it could have worked with James Stewart and Kim Novak, whereas I had... oh, well, I can't even remember their names." The film has received a score of 71% on review aggregation website Rotten Tomatoes, with seven reviews posted, which note the stylish look to the film, but negatively point out its story. Sight & Sound stated that "Although certainly pioneering, The Girl Who Knew Too Much is a low-key, modest film. It would be Bava's subsequent production, the violent, striking Blood and Black Lace, that would announce the genre's arrival in bold primary colours."

References

Footnotes

Sources

External links 

 
 
 

1963 films
1963 comedy films
1960s mystery films
1960s psychological thriller films
1960s comedy thriller films
1960s Italian-language films
American International Pictures films
Italian black-and-white films
Films directed by Mario Bava
Films set in Rome
Giallo films
Italian thriller films
Films about cannabis
Films shot in Rome
1960s Italian films